Emile Shoufani, (born 24 May 1947 in Nazareth) is an Israeli Arab Christian theologist, educator and activist for peace, archimandrite of the Melkite Greek Catholic Church. 
Fr. Emile Shoufani won UNESCO Prize for Peace Education (2003).

Biography
Emile Shoufani is the second of eight children raised by a Melkite father and an Orthodox mother. A few months after Israel's establishing in 1948, he was deported with his family. His grandfather and uncle were killed by the Israeli army during the first Arab-Israeli war. Raised by his grandmother, the latter taught him the value of forgiveness and the rejection of hatred. He became Choirboy at the church Eilaboun, which was built after 1949, he was soon fascinated by the liturgy and entered the seminary at the age of 13. Sent to France by his superiors at age 17, he studied philosophy and theology at the Seminary of Morsang-sur-Orge, then the seminary of St. Sulpice of Issy-les-Moulineaux in 1966.

Priesthood
As a priest in Nazareth, he taught at St. Joseph Seminary & High School at Nazareth where he became manager in 1976. In the college where half the students are Muslims and one Christian, Fr. Shoufani works every day to encourage the teaching of democratic values and dialogue. For over twenty years, encounters with Jewish schools are held three times a year.

Jewish-Arab reconciliation
Living in the heart of Israeli-Palestinian clashes, he understands that the best way to take a step towards reconciliation and dialogue is to teach the Holocaust. In late 2002, he organized the first Jewish-Arab travel to Auschwitz-Birkenau in May 2003. Jean Mouttapa, Director of Spirituality of Editions Albin Michel and a strong player in interreligious dialogue, he brings valuable assistance in organizing the French part of the pilgrimage and creates the association "Memory for Peace". This initiative supported by many intellectuals in Israel has attracted over 500 people and earned him the Unesco Prize for Peace Education in the same year.

"Whoever is in front of me is someone who has a quality experience and not an identity card to brandish."

"Memory for Peace"

"I appeal to my Arab brothers to join me together make a strong gesture, audacious and absolutely free. At the place that incarnates the atrocity of genocide, Auschwitz-Birkenau, we will proclaim our brotherhood with the millions of victims ... This act of remembrance will indicate our deep rejection of such inhuman It demonstrates our ability to understand the wounds of others. "

"I appeal to my Jewish brethren to realize that the vast majority of Arab and Muslim world, the conflict tearing us apart is not religious, racial or even less. The Arab are not the successors of those who once wanted to wipe out the Jews as Jews. Like them heirs of the faith of Abraham, they are like them carrying light values. "

"This trip to the darkest depths of the memory of mankind can in no way relativize the suffering of other people in other places and at other times. It will on the contrary bring us face our responsibilities now, and our vocation as human beings turned into aliving together.

See also

Melkite Greek Catholic Archeparchy of Akka

References

Further reading
Christian Celebration (2004), a group with Didier Decoin Emmanuelli Sylvie Germain Frédérique Hébrard Colette Nys-Mazure Marie Rouanet, Michel Tournier
As a watchman waits for Peace (2002) Interview with Hubert Prolongeau. Price Spiritualities Today in 2003
Celebration of Light (2001), with 
Journey in Galilee (1999)
 Hubert Prolongeau, Le curé de Nazareth. Emile Shoufani, Arabe israélien, homme de parole en Galilée, Albin Michel, 1998. (biography, in French, also exists in Dutch)

External links
 Official Website

1947 births
Living people
Arab citizens of Israel
Israeli Melkite Greek Catholics
People from Nazareth
Israeli Arab Christians
Archimandrites